Laugher may refer to:
Someone who laughs
The laugher (Charadra deridens), a species of moth

See also
Laffer (disambiguation)